Richard Grafton (born c. 1563) was an English politician.

He was an MP for Plympton Erle in 1589 and Tregony in 1584.

References

1560s births
Year of death missing
Members of the pre-1707 English Parliament for constituencies in Cornwall
English MPs 1584–1585
English MPs 1589
Members of the Parliament of England for Plympton Erle